3M is an American multinational conglomerate corporation.

3M may also refer to:

 3M computer
 3-M syndrome, or dolichospondylic dysplasia, gloomy face syndrome, le Merrer syndrome
 Myasishchev 3M, Soviet bomber, NATO reporting name Bison-B
 3-metre springboard
 The IATA code for Silver Airways

See also

 
 
 Triple M (disambiguation)
 MMM (disambiguation)
 M3 (disambiguation)